Último Bondi a Finisterre (Last Bus to Finisterre) is the ninth album by Argentine rock band Patricio Rey y sus Redonditos de Ricota, released in 1998. This is a more particular of the albums of the band, since they use samplers and sound effects in most of the recording. Besides the use of darker themes in the songs.

Background 
This is the first album recorded at the Indio Solari's home studio "Luzbola", and during the first sessions, Beilinson and Solari had creative differences, due to the idea of include new sounds in the band. However, Beilinson provided a heavier and darker sound to the songs, and Solari included special effects and lyrics without much metaphoric expressions.

The song "Pogo" is based on the John Wayne Gacy murders.

Último Bondi a Finisterre was the first album to feature Hernán Aramberri as official band member.

Track listing 
All songs written by Solari/Beilinson.

Data sheet 
Drums:El hijo de Dios [The Son of God] (Walter Sidotti)
Bass:El guerrero audaz [(The Fearless Warrior] (Semilla Bucciarelli)
Saxophone and Keyboard: El que guarda y protege [The one who guards and protects] (Sergio Dawi)
Guitars and Tricks: El que gobierna la paz [The one who rules peace] (Skay Beilinson)
Voice, badges and artifices: El varón viril y de gran fuerza [The virile man with great strength (Indio solari)
Artifice operator: Hernán Aramberri

Violin: Sergio Poli (Scaramanzia)
Trumpet: Juan Cruz Urquiza (El árbol del Gran Bonete, Gualicho and Scaramanzia)
Piano: Lito Vitale (La pequeña novia del carioca and Drogocop)
Gunboat: Eduardo "El niño" Herrera
Healer: Mario "El sanador" Breuer
Gadgets: La celestial
Virtual postcards: Rocambole
Container concept: Cybergraph RCA/Grafikar
Prototype technology: O. Rojas Fonum
Cybergraphic operation: Juan Manuel Moreno
Produced by: Patricio Rey Discos
Distributed by: DBN (Distribuidora Belgrano Norte)

References 

Patricio Rey y sus Redonditos de Ricota albums
1998 albums